Robert L. Perea (born in Wheatland, Wyoming) is an American author. He has written short stories and novels, and his work contains elements of magical realism.

Perea is of Mexican-American and Oglala Lakota heritage. He is a Vietnam War veteran and a graduate of the University of New Mexico.  He is a former professor of philosophy and history at Central Arizona College. Perea's Stacey's Story received the 1992 First Book Award for Poetry from the Native Writers' Circle of the Americas.

References
Kratzert, M. "Native American Literature: Expanding the Canon", Collection Building Vol. 17, 1, 1998, p. 4

Living people
Native American writers
American writers of Mexican descent
Oglala people
Year of birth missing (living people)